Cascavel Futsal Clube, is a Brazilian futsal club from Cascavel founded in 1991 which plays in Liga Futsal.

Club honours

State competitions
 Taça Paraná de Futsal: 2013
 Chave Ouro (5): 2003, 2004, 2005, 2011, 2012
 Chave Prata: 1998
 Jogos Abertos do Paraná (2): 1996, 2014

Other competitions
 Copa TV Naipi de Futsal: 2000

Current squad

References

External links
 Cascavel Futsal official website
 Cascavel Futsal LNF profile
 Cascavel Futsal in zerozero.pt

Futsal clubs established in 1991
1991 establishments in Brazil
Futsal clubs in Brazil
Sports teams in Paraná